Tekin Salimi is a Canadian venture capitalist and lawyer who is the founder of dao5, an experimental cryptocurrency investment fund. He is also the former general partner at Polychain Capaital.

Early life and education 
Salimi was born in Turkey, but when he was a young child, his family relocated to Toronto, Canada. He holds a Juris Doctor (JD) from Osgoode Hall Law School, Toronto.

Business career 
He started his career as a corporate lawyer at Torys LLP. He began working with Polychain Capital in 2018 and remained there till 2022.

In 2022, he founded dao5, a $125 million Web3 venture fund with the intention of turning it into a decentralized autonomous organization (DAO) by 2025. Upon conversion, dao5 tokens will be minted and issued to the fund's advisory board, investment team, and founders of portfolio companies. dao5's advisory board include Emin Gün Sirer, Ben Fisch, professor of computer science at Yale University, and Ivan Soto-Wright, founder of Moonpay.

References 

Living people
21st-century Canadian businesspeople
People associated with cryptocurrency